Jacob Larsen may refer to:

 Jacob Larsen (cricketer) (born 1979), Danish cricketer
 Jacob Larsen (rower) (born 1988), Danish rower
 Jacob Larsen (basketball) (born 1997), Danish basketball player
 Jacob Bruun Larsen (born 1998), Danish footballer

See also
 Jakob Larsen (disambiguation)
 Jacob Larsson